Konstantin Grigorievich Spodarenko (born April 4, 1972) is a retired Kazakh professional ice hockey player.

Career statistics

External links

1972 births
Energia Kemerovo players
Kazakhstani ice hockey forwards
Kazzinc-Torpedo players
Living people
Neftyanik Almetyevsk players
Soviet ice hockey forwards
Sportspeople from Oskemen
Yuzhny Ural Orsk players